San Lorenzo de Quinti District is one of thirty-two districts of the province Huarochirí in Peru.

Geography 
The Paryaqaqa or Waruchiri mountain range is the north-eastern border of the district. Other mountains are listed below:

See also
 Ch'uspiqucha
 P'itiqucha

References